Fearrington Village is a residential development and census-designated place (CDP) in Chatham County, North Carolina, United States. The population was 2,339 at the 2010 census, up from 903 in 2000. Its name is phonetically pronounced FAIR-ington, not FEAR-ington as the spelling might indicate. The CDP occupies what was formerly the area of the unincorporated community of Farrington. It is a mixed-use community located on farmland dating back to the 18th century in Pittsboro, North Carolina. The community is located about 15 minutes from Chapel Hill, a half-hour from Durham and 45 minutes from Raleigh.

Geography
Fearrington Village is located in northeastern Chatham County at  (35.804190, -79.083195). U.S. Routes 15 and 501 form the northwestern edge of the community, leading north  to Chapel Hill and south  to Pittsboro, the Chatham County seat.

Demographics

2020 census

As of the 2020 United States census, there were 2,557 people, 1,663 households, and 787 families residing in the CDP.

2010 census
As of the census of 2010, there were 2,339 people. As of the census of 2000, there were 903 people, 506 households, and 357 families residing in the CDP. The population density was 391.9 people per square mile (151.6/km2). There were 533 housing units at an average density of 231.3 per square mile (89.5/km2). The racial makeup of the CDP was 96.79% White, 2.99% African American, 0.11% Pacific Islander, and 0.11% from two or more races. Hispanic or Latino of any race were 0.22% of the population.

There were 506 households, out of which 2.4% had children under the age of 18 living with them, 67.0% were married couples living together, 3.2% had a female householder with no husband present, and 29.4% were non-families. 27.9% of all households were made up of individuals, and 20.9% had someone living alone who was 65 years of age or older. The average household size was 1.78 and the average family size was 2.08. A 2018 analysis by the National Center for Health Statistics found that the life expectancy in Fearrington is 97 years old.

In the CDP, the population was spread out, with 2.1% under the age of 18, 0.8% from 18 to 24, 5.6% from 25 to 44, 19.6% from 45 to 64, and 71.9% who were 65 years of age or older. The median age was 70 years. For every 100 females, there were 79.2 males. For every 100 females age 18 and over, there were 77.9 males.

The median income for a household in the CDP was $66,198, and the median income for a family was $68,281. Males had a median income of $55,278 versus $28,068 for females. The per capita income for the CDP was $41,000. About 3.8% of families and 6.8% of the population were below the poverty line, including 9.3% of those under age 18 and 1.9% of those age 65 or over.

History 
The community began in 1974 when R.B. Fitch and his late wife Jenny purchased the two-centuries old dairy farm from Jesse Fearrington. Jesse inherited the 640 acre farm that was purchased for 100 shillings in 1786 from John Oldham by his great-great-great grandfather, William Cole. They named the community Fearrington to honor the stewardship of Jesse and his forebears.

The Fitches slowly began to craft a unique community from the rolling pastures and wooded acres of the farm, where residents would enjoy dining, relaxing, shopping and living.

The Fitches aimed to recreate the smaller villages of England and modeled the Fearrington Village Center after those hamlets long before the term "mixed-use community" joined the lexicon. They wanted to create a "coming together place" where one could pick up daily necessities, have lunch with friends, and enjoy an English garden setting.

Over the last 30 years the community has grown to include over 1800 residents, an award-winning country inn and restaurant (The Fearrington House), a cafe & bar, chocolate and wine shop, an independent bookstore, a home décor shop, plants and garden art shop and more. Belted Galloway cows, the village's iconic mascot, were added to the farm in 1983.

The Fearrington House Country Inn is one of only two AAA five-diamond facilities in the state, earning the Five Diamond designation 15 years in a row, more times than any other accommodation in the Carolinas. The Inn is also North Carolina's only five-star hotel, according to Mobil Travel Guide's annual rankings.

Crafts
Fearrington Village is home to many creative visual artists and producers of fine crafts, who welcome visitors to their studios.

References

External links
 Fearrington Village developer
 Fearrington House Country Inn

Census-designated places in Chatham County, North Carolina
Census-designated places in North Carolina